The 2021 Music Victoria Awards were the 16th Annual Music Victoria Awards. The ceremony took place on 9 December 2021 at the Melbourne Recital Centre.

The 2021 awards featured a number of changes, including a brand new category for Best Pop Act and the inaugural Arts Access Victoria Amplify Award (for deaf and disabled musicians). All genre categories will now be assessed on the act rather than album, with the requirement that nominees have released at least multiple recordings between 1 July 2020 – 30 June 2021.

New CEO Simone Schinkel headed up the event for the first time this year, taking over from Music Victoria founder, Patrick Donovan. Schinkel said "As part of our commitment to continual improvement we have refined our Awards criteria, categories and judging processes which we believe will more accurately reflect and reward the diverse music community in Victoria."

Hall of Fame inductees
The Hall of Fame inductees were announced on 7 October 2021 
 Kylie Minogue
 Pierre Baroni
Pierre Baroni was a musician and a member of The Pony, an artist-designer at Mushroom Records, a producer and presented the Soulgroove '66 show on 3PBS 106.7FM from 2003 until his death from cancer in March 2021.

Performers
Emma Donovan & The Putbacks
Kerryn Fields
Maple Glider
Mindy Meng Wang & Tim Shiel

Award nominees and winners
Winners indicated in boldface, with other nominees in plain.

General awards
The general award are nominated by an expert industry panel and open to public voting in October.

Genre Specific Awards
Voted by a select industry panel

Industry Awards
Voted by a select industry panel.

References

External links
 

2021 in Australian music
2021 music awards
Music Victoria Awards